Opus is the sixth studio album by Austrian pop rock band Opus. It was released in 1987. It peaked at #7 on the Ö3 Austria Top 40 Longplay. The first single "Whiteland", peaked at #3 on the Ö3 Austria Top 40 Singles and #2 on the Ö3-Hitparade. The second single, "Faster and Faster", peaked at #12 on the Ö3 Austria Top 40 Singles and #2 on the Ö3-Hitparade. The third single, "Will You Ever Know Me", peaked at #24 on the Ö3-Hitparade.

Track listing

References

Opus (Austrian band) albums
1987 albums
Polydor Records albums